Woodland Hills is a neighborhood bordering the Santa Monica Mountains in the San Fernando Valley region of Los Angeles, California.

History
The area was inhabited for around 8,000 years by Native Americans of the Fernandeño-Tataviam and Chumash-Venturaño tribes, who lived in the Santa Monica Mountains and Simi Hills and close to the Arroyo Calabasas (Calabasas Creek) tributary of the Los Angeles River in present-day Woodland Hills. The first Europeans to enter the San Fernando Valley were the Portola Expedition in 1769, exploring Alta California for Spanish mission and settlement locations. Seeing it from present-day Sepulveda Pass, the oak savanna inspired them to call the area El Valle de Santa Catalina de Bononia de Los Encinos (Valley of St. Catherine of Bononia of the Oaks).
The Mission San Fernando Rey de España (Mission San Fernando) was established in 1797 and controlled the valley's land, including future Woodland Hills.

Ownership of the southern half of the valley, south of present-day Roscoe Boulevard from Toluca Lake to Woodland Hills, by Americans began in the 1860s, first Isaac Lankershim (as the "San Fernando Farm Homestead Association") in 1869, then Isaac Lankershim's son, James Boon Lankershim, and Isaac Newton Van Nuys (as the "Los Angeles Farm & Milling Company") in 1873, and finally in the "biggest land transaction ever recorded in Los Angeles County" a syndicate led by Harry Chandler of the Los Angeles Times with Hobart Johnstone Whitley, Gen. Moses Sherman, and others (as the Los Angeles Suburban Homes Company) in 1910.

Victor Girard Kleinberger bought  in the area from Chandler's group and founded the town of Girard in 1922. He sought to attract residents and businesses by developing an infrastructure, advertising in newspapers, and planting 120,000 trees. His 300 pepper trees formed a canopy over Canoga Ave. between Ventura Boulevard and Saltillo St. became Los Angeles Historic-Cultural Monument #93 in 1972. The community of Girard was eventually incorporated into Los Angeles, and in 1945, it became known as Woodland Hills.

Geography
Woodland Hills is in the southwestern region of the San Fernando Valley, which is located east of Calabasas and west of Tarzana. On the north it is bordered by West Hills, Canoga Park, Winnetka, and Reseda, and on the south by the Santa Monica Mountains.

Some neighborhoods are in the foothills of the Santa Monica Mountains. Running east–west through the community are U.S. Route 101 (the Ventura Freeway) and Ventura Boulevard, whose western terminus is at Valley Circle Boulevard in Woodland Hills.

Climate

Within the San Fernando Valley, Woodland Hills experiences some of the more extreme temperature changes season to season than other regions. During the summer, temperatures are often very hot, while during the winter, overnight temperatures are among the coldest of the region. On September 6, 2020, Woodland Hills recorded the highest temperature ever in Los Angeles County, hitting  at Pierce College, tying with Chino's reading as the highest temperature ever recorded west of the mountains in Southern California. The climate is classified as a hot-summer Mediterranean climate (Csa) in the Köppen climate classification, which is characterized by mild, rainy winters and hot, dry summers. Precipitation in Woodland Hills averages much the same as most other regions of the west San Fernando Valley, although somewhat higher amounts of rainfall occur in the surrounding hills.

Demographics
 
In 2008 the population of Woodland Hills was approximately 63,000. The median age in 2000 was 40, considered old when compared to other city and county jurisdictions.

As of the 2000 census, and according to the Los Angeles Almanac, there were 67,006 people and 29,119 households residing in Woodland Hills. The racial makeup of the neighborhood was 79.90% White, 6.97% Asian, 0.13% Pacific Islander, 3.34% African American, 0.33% Native American, 4.80% from other races, and 4.52% from two or more races. 11.94% of the population were Hispanic of any race.

In population, it is one of the least dense neighborhoods in Los Angeles, and the percentage of white people is high for the county. The percentage of residents 25 and older with four-year college degrees is 47.0%, which was high for both the city and the county. The percentage of veterans, 10.7% of the population, was high for the city of Los Angeles and high for the county overall. The percentage of veterans who served during World War II or Korea was among the county's highest.

The 2008 Los Angeles Timess "Mapping L.A." project supplied these Woodland Hills neighborhood statistics: population: 59,661; median household income: $93,720. The Times said the latter figure was "high for the city of Los Angeles and high for the county."

Arts and culture
The Los Angeles Public Library operates the Woodland Hills Branch Library (Ventura Boulevard) and the Platt Branch Library (Victory Boulevard) in Woodland Hills.

Parks and recreation

Woodland Hills is home to the Woodland Hills Country Club, a private equity golf club. The country club is complete with golf course, fine dining, and entertainment options.

The Woodland Hills Recreation Center (Shoup Park) is a  park in Woodland Hills. The park has a small indoor gymnasium without weights and with a capacity of 300; it may be used as an auditorium. The park also has a lighted baseball diamond, outdoor lighted basketball courts, a children's play area, a lighted football field, picnic tables, a lighted soccer field, and lighted tennis courts. Woodland Hills Pool is an outdoor seasonal unheated swimming pool.

The Warner Center Park, also known as Warner Ranch Park, is located in Woodland Hills. The park, unstaffed and unlocked, has a children's play area and picnic tables.
Serrania Park in Woodland Hills is an unstaffed, unlocked pocket park. It has a children's play area, hiking trails, and picnic tables. Alizondo Drive Park in Woodland Hills is an unstaffed, unlocked, and undeveloped park used for brush clearance once per year.

Along the western boundary of Woodland Hills is the large Upper Las Virgenes Canyon Open Space Preserve, a regional park with a trail network for miles of hiking, mountain biking, and equestrian rides. The trailhead and parking are at the very western end of Victory Boulevard in Woodland Hills. Scheduled walks and programs are offered. The Santa Monica Mountains National Recreation Area has various parks nearby to the south of the community. The Top of Topanga Overlook gives panoramic views of the verdant Woodland Hills neighborhoods and the Valley.

Government

Local government
Woodland Hills Warner Center Neighborhood Council is the local elected advisory body to the city of Los Angeles representing stakeholders in the Woodland Hills and Warner Center areas.

Woodland Hills is located within Los Angeles City Council District 3 represented by Bob Blumenfield.

State representation

Woodland Hills is within California's 45th State Assembly district represented by Democrat Jesse Gabriel and California's 27th State Senate district represented by Democrat Henry Stern.

Federal representation

Woodland Hills is represented in the United States Senate by California's Senators Dianne Feinstein and Alex Padilla.
Woodland Hills is located within California's 30th congressional district represented by Democrat Brad Sherman.

Education

Primary and secondary schools

Public schools

Public schools serving Woodland Hills are under the jurisdiction the Los Angeles Unified School District. Much of the area is within Board District 4.

Elementary schools include:
Calabash Street Elementary School
Lockhurst Elementary School
Serrania Elementary School
Woodlake Avenue Elementary School
Woodland Hills Charter for Enriched Studies
Ivy Academia Entrepreneurial Charter School
Calvert Street Elementary School

Middle schools include:
Woodland Hills Charter Academy (formerly known as Parkman Middle School)
The school opened in 1959 as "Parkman Junior High School." It received its current name in 2006.
George Ellery Hale Charter Academy

High schools include:

El Camino Real High School
William Howard Taft High School
Henry David Thoreau Continuation High School

Adult School: 
 West Valley Occuptional Center, 6200 Winnetka Avenue

Charter schools
 El Camino Real High School
 William Howard Taft Charter High School
 Ingenium Charter School – Kindergarten through Sixth Grade
 George Ellery Hale Charter Academy 6–8 grade
 Chime Charter School K-8
 Serrania Charter for Enriched Studies – K-5
 Calvert School for Enriched Studies – K-5

Private schools
The Alexandria Academy – secular school serving First through Twelfth Grade
Halsey Schools – 6 weeks – 6 years.
Louisville High School – All-female Catholic High School
St. Bernardine of Siena – preschool through Eighth Grade
St. Mel – preschool through Eighth Grade
Woodland Hills Private School – serving Preschool (starting at 2 years old) through Fifth Grade.

Lycée International de Los Angeles had a Woodland Hills campus, which had over 140 students as of 2001. This was in a public school building, rented from the Los Angeles Unified School District. In 2001 LAUSD announced that it would not renew the lease.

Lycée Français de Los Angeles operated a San Fernando Valley campus in Woodland Hills, on the site of Platt Elementary School.

Colleges and universities
Colleges and universities in Woodland Hills include:
Los Angeles Pierce College (part of the Los Angeles Community College District)

Infrastructure
Los Angeles Fire Department Station 84 (Woodland Hills) and Station 105 (Woodland Hills) serve the community.

The Los Angeles Police Department operates the Topanga Division station in Canoga Park which provides service to the Woodland Hills area.

Notable people
The Motion Picture & Television Country House and Hospital, a private retirement, nursing care and acute-care hospital facility is reserved for industry professionals. The section includes some people who lived and/or died there, among other residents.

 Sara Paxton, actress
 Christopher Mintz-Plasse, actor
 Bud Abbott, actor
 Jacques Aubuchon, actor, lived in Woodland Hills at the time of his death. 
 Rick Auerbach, Major League Baseball player
 Orr Barouch, Israeli professional soccer player
 Justine Bateman, actress (Originally from Rye, New York)
 Roy Campanella, Major League Baseball player
 Helena Carroll, actress
 Mary Carver, actress
 Ted Cassidy, actor; his cremated remains are buried in an unmarked location at his former Woodland Hills residence.
 Mary Dodson, art director
 Dr. Dre, rapper, producer, entrepreneur
 John Feldmann, musician, songwriter, and producer
 Jeff Fisher, NFL head coach, attended high school in Woodland Hills.
 Andy Gibb, singer
 Raymond Greenleaf, actor 
 Ryan Hurst, actor, producer, and director
 Buster Keaton, actor and director
 Chief Keef, rapper
 Jack Klugman, actor
 Ryan Lavarnway, Major League Baseball catcher
 Geoffrey Lewis, actor
 Austin Matelson (aka Luchasaurus), professional wrestler, grew up in Woodland Hills.
 Charles McPhee, author, talk-show host, "The Dream Doctor Show", Dream Researcher, 1962–2011
 Meghan, Duchess of Sussex, actress 
 Janel Moloney, actress
 Dolores Moran, actress
 Nichelle Nichols, actress on Star Trek: The Original Series, recruiter for NASA
 Joy Picus, City Council member, 1977–91; Ms. magazine Woman of the Year
Rafa Sardina, 4-time Grammy Award and 10-time Latin Grammy Award winner recording and mixing engineer resides in Woodland Hills.
 Tupac Shakur, rapper, writer, and actor.
 Thomas D. Shepard, City Council member, 1961–67
 Tyler Skaggs, Major League Baseball player for the Los Angeles Angels of Anaheim
 Jan Smithers, actress
 Russell Thacher (1919-1990), author and film producer who co-produced the films Soylent Green and The Last Hard Men together with Walter Seltzer
 Laurence Trimble, actor, writer, film director
Troy Van Leeuwen, musician and record producer
 Don Van Vliet (aka Captain Beefheart), musician, singer and composer. Captain Beefheart's definitive album Trout Mask Replica was composed and rehearsed in a communal house in Woodland Hills in 1968–1969.
 Robin Yount, Hall of Fame baseball player

See also

 Santa Monica Mountains National Recreation Area
 Simi Hills

References

External links

 Woodland Hills Warner Center Neighborhood Council
 Woodland Hills-Tarzana Chamber of Commerce
 About Woodland Hills

 

 
1922 establishments in California
Communities in the San Fernando Valley
Neighborhoods in Los Angeles
Populated places in the Santa Monica Mountains
Populated places established in 1922
San Fernando Valley